York Technical College (York Tech) is a public community college in Rock Hill, South Carolina. It is part of the South Carolina Technical College System and one of three colleges in the city of Rock Hill. York Tech was established in 1964 and presently serves York, Chester, and Lancaster counties.

References

External links

Buildings and structures in Rock Hill, South Carolina
Universities and colleges accredited by the Southern Association of Colleges and Schools
Educational institutions established in 1964
Education in York County, South Carolina
Education in Lancaster County, South Carolina
Education in Chester County, South Carolina
South Carolina Technical College System
1964 establishments in South Carolina